{{Speciesbox
| image =   
| image_caption =  
| status_system = IUCN3.1
| status = LC
| status_ref=
| taxon = Leptochilichthys agassizii 
| authority = (Garman, 1899)
| synonyms = *Leptochilichthys agassizi 
Leptochilichthys agassizi macrops 
Leptochilichthys macrops  | synonyms_ref = 
}}

Agassiz' smooth-head (Leptochilichthys agassizii'') is a species of fish in the family Alepocephalidae. It is named for the scientist and engineer Alexander Agassiz (1835–1910), who commanded the 1899 survey aboard the USS Albatross on which the fish was discovered.

Description

Agassiz' smooth-head is brownish in colour, with a large head. It has large scales, with  47–52 in its lateral line.

Habitat

Reproduction

References

Alepocephalidae
Fish described in 1899
Taxa named by Samuel Garman